Eckart Diesch (born 1 May 1954 in Friedrichshafen) is a German sailor, Olympic champion and world champion. He won a gold medal in the Flying Dutchman Class with Jörg Diesch at the 1976 Summer Olympics in Montreal. He received a gold medal at the 1986 world championships, and received five silver medals and two bronze medals between 1975 and 1985, all with Jörg Diesch.

References

External links
 
 
 

1954 births
Living people
German male sailors (sport)
Sailors at the 1976 Summer Olympics – Flying Dutchman
Sailors at the 1984 Summer Olympics – Flying Dutchman
Olympic sailors of West Germany
Olympic gold medalists for West Germany
People from Friedrichshafen
Sportspeople from Tübingen (region)
Olympic medalists in sailing
Medalists at the 1976 Summer Olympics
Flying Dutchman class world champions
World champions in sailing for Germany